Aleksei Gennadiyevich Vostrikov (born 4 January 1992) is a Russian sprint canoeist.

He won a medal at the 2019 ICF Canoe Sprint World Championships.

References

External links

1992 births
Living people
ICF Canoe Sprint World Championships medalists in kayak
Russian male canoeists
Universiade medalists in canoeing
Universiade gold medalists for Russia
Medalists at the 2013 Summer Universiade